Irina Viktorovna Kryukova (born 18 May 1968),  Kulish, is a Russian chess player who holds the FIDE title of Woman Grandmaster (WGM, 2001).

Biography
In the early and mid-1990s, Irina Kryukova was among the leading female chess players in Russia. In 1994, she won silver medal in Russian Women's Chess Championship behind Ekaterina Kovalevskaya.

Irina Kryukova two times participated in the Women's World Chess Championship Interzonal Tournaments:
 In 1993, at Interzonal Tournament in Jakarta ranked 19th place;
 In 1995, at Interzonal Tournament in Chişinău ranked 38th place.

Irina Kryukova played for Russia-2 team in the Women's Chess Olympiad:
 In 1994, at first board in the 31st Chess Olympiad (women) in Moscow (+5, =5, -2).

In 1993, she was awarded the FIDE Woman International Master (WIM) title and received the FIDE Woman Grandmaster (WGM) title eight year later. Also Kryukova received FIDE International Arbiter (IA, 2011) and FIDE International Organizer (FIO, 2012) titles.

Known as a chess trainer in various chess schools in Moscow and Moscow Oblast, where she has worked for more than 20 years.

References

External links
 
 
 

1968 births
Living people
Sportspeople from Krasnoyarsk
Russian female chess players
Soviet female chess players
Chess woman grandmasters
Chess Olympiad competitors
Chess arbiters
20th-century Russian women
21st-century Russian women